The Sinclair ZX80 is a home computer launched on 29 January 1980 by Science of Cambridge Ltd. (later to be better known as Sinclair Research). It is notable for being one of the first computers available in the United Kingdom for less than a hundred pounds. It was available in kit form for £79.95, where purchasers had to assemble and solder it together, and as a ready-built version at £99.95.

The ZX80 was very popular straight away, and for some time there was a waiting list of several months for either version of the machine.

Name 

The ZX80 was named after the Z80 processor with the 'X' meaning "the mystery ingredient".

Hardware 

Internally, the machine was designed by Jim Westwood around a Z80 central processing unit with a clock speed of 3.25 MHz, and was equipped with 1 KB of static RAM and 4 KB of read-only memory (ROM). It had no sound output.

The ZX80 was designed around readily available TTL chips; the only proprietary technology was the firmware.

The machine was mounted in a small white plastic case, with a one-piece blue membrane keyboard on the front. There were problems with durability, reliability and overheating (despite appearances, the black stripes visible on the top rear of the case are merely cosmetic, and are not ventilation slots).

Display was over an RF connection to a household television, and simple offline program storage was possible using a cassette recorder. The video display generator of the ZX80 used minimal hardware plus a combination of software to generate a video signal. This was an idea that was popularised by Don Lancaster in his 1978 book The TV Cheap Video Cookbook and his "TV Typewriter". As a result of this approach the ZX80 could only generate a picture when it was idle, i.e. waiting for a key to be pressed. When running a BASIC program, or even when pressing a key for any input, the display would, therefore, blank out momentarily while the processor was busy. This made moving graphics difficult since the program had to introduce a pause for input to display the next change in graphical output.

Video output was black-and-white, character-based. However, the ZX80 character set included some simple block-based graphics glyphs, allowing basic graphics to be accomplished, with some effort. One advantage to using monochrome video is that different colour broadcast standards (e.g. PAL, SECAM) simply weren't an issue when the system was sold outside the UK.

Firmware 

The ROM contained the Sinclair BASIC programming language, editor, and operating system. BASIC commands were not entered by typing them out but were instead selected somewhat similarly to a programmable graphing calculator - each key had a few different functions selected by both context and modes as well as with the shift key.

Expansion 

Other than the built-in cassette and video ports, the only provided means of expansion was a slot opening at the rear of the case, which exposed an expansion bus edge connector on the motherboard. The same slot bus was continued on the ZX81, and later the ZX Spectrum, which encouraged a small cottage industry of expansion devices, including memory packs, printers and even floppy drives. The original Sinclair ZX80 RAM Pack held either 1, 2 or 3 KB of static RAM  and a later model held 16 KB of dynamic RAM (DRAM).

Following the ZX81's release, a ZX81 8 KB ROM was available to upgrade the ZX80 at a cost of around 20% of a real ZX81. It came with a thin keyboard overlay and a ZX81 manual. By simply taking off the top cover of the ZX80 and prying the old ROM from its socket and carefully inserting the new ROM and adding the keyboard overlay, the ZX80 would now function almost identically to the proper ZX81 – except for SLOW mode, due to the differences in hardware between the two models. The process was easily reversed to return the ZX80 to its original configuration.

One common modification by hobbyist users was to attach a full-size keyboard, optionally moving the motherboard into a larger case. This had the dual advantages of making the machine easier to type on, while increasing ventilation to the motherboard.

Versions 

The UK version of the machine was the standard, and only changes that were absolutely necessary to sell units in other markets were made. In fact, the only real change made in most markets involved the video output frequency (the ZX80 used an external power transformer, so differences in AC line frequency and outlet were not an issue to the machine itself).

Reception 

The ZX80 was widely advertised as the first personal computer for under £100 GBP (US$200.) Kilobaud Microcomputing liked the design of the preassembled version, and said that the screen flickering during input or output was annoying but was useful as an indicator of the computer functioning correctly. It praised the documentation as excellent for novices, and noted that purchasing the computer was cheaper than taking a college class on BASIC. The magazine concluded, "The ZX-80 is a real computer and an excellent value", but only for beginners who could learn from the documentation or programmers experienced with writing Z-80 software. BYTE called the ZX80 a "remarkable device". It praised the real-time, interactive BASIC syntax checking, and reported that the computer performed better on benchmarks than some competitors, including the TRS-80 Model I. The screen blanking during program execution, the small RAM size and inadequate built-in Sinclair BASIC, and the keyboard received criticism, and the review recommended against buying the kit version of the computer given the difficulty of assembly and because purchasers did not save money. BYTE concluded that "the ZX80 might be summarized as a high-performance, very low-cost, portable personal computer system ... the ZX80 is a good starting point".

Sales of the ZX80 reached about 50,000, which contributed significantly to the UK leading the world in home computer ownership through the 1980s. Owing to the unsophisticated design and the tendency for the units to overheat, surviving machines in good condition are sought after and can fetch high prices by collectors.

Clones 

There were also clones of the ZX80, such as the MicroAce, and from Brazil the Nova Eletrônica/Prológica NE-Z80 and the Microdigital TK80.

References

External links 

 Planet Sinclair:ZX80
 
 Scot's ZX80 site via archive.org

English inventions
Computers designed in the United Kingdom
Early microcomputers
Z80-based home computers
Computer-related introductions in 1980
Home video game consoles
Products and services discontinued in 1981
ZX80